Meridian Field is a multi-use rugby stadium in Village of Grace, Providenciales, Turks and Caicos Islands. It is currently used for rugby union.

References

External links 
 Official site of Turks and Caicos Islands Rugby Football Union
 Wikimapia
 

Rugby union stadiums in the Turks and Caicos Islands
Providenciales
Sports venues completed in 2011